In object-oriented programming, the iterator pattern is a design pattern in which an iterator is used to traverse a container and access the container's elements. The iterator pattern decouples algorithms from containers; in some cases, algorithms are necessarily container-specific and thus cannot be decoupled.

For example, the hypothetical algorithm SearchForElement can be implemented generally using a specified type of iterator rather than implementing it as a container-specific algorithm. This allows SearchForElement to be used on any container that supports the required type of iterator.

Overview
The Iterator

design pattern is one of the twenty-three well-known 
GoF design patterns 
that describe how to solve recurring design problems to design flexible and reusable object-oriented software, that is, objects that are easier to implement, change, test, and reuse.

What problems can the Iterator design pattern solve?

 The elements of an aggregate object should be accessed and traversed without exposing its representation (data structures).
 New traversal operations should be defined for an aggregate object without changing its interface.

Defining access and traversal operations in the aggregate interface is inflexible because it commits the aggregate to particular access and traversal operations and makes it impossible to add new operations
later without having to change the aggregate interface.

What solution does the Iterator design pattern describe?

 Define a separate (iterator) object that encapsulates accessing and traversing an aggregate object.
 Clients use an iterator to access and traverse an aggregate without knowing its representation (data structures).

Different iterators can be used to access and traverse an aggregate in different ways. 
New access and traversal operations can be defined independently by defining new iterators.

See also the UML class and sequence diagram below.

Definition
The essence of the Iterator Pattern is to "Provide a way to access the elements of an aggregate object sequentially without exposing its underlying representation.".

Structure

UML class and sequence diagram 

In the above UML class diagram, the Client class refers (1) to the Aggregate interface for creating an Iterator object (createIterator()) and (2) to the Iterator interface for traversing an Aggregate object (next(),hasNext()).
The Iterator1 class implements the Iterator interface by accessing the Aggregate1 class.

The UML sequence diagram
shows the run-time interactions: The Client object calls createIterator() on an Aggregate1 object, which creates an Iterator1 object and returns it
to the Client.
The Client uses then Iterator1 to traverse the elements of the Aggregate1 object.

UML class diagram

Language-specific implementation 

Some languages standardize syntax. C++ and Python are notable examples.

C# 
.NET Framework has special interfaces that support a simple iteration: System.Collections.IEnumerator over a non-generic collection and System.Collections.Generic.IEnumerator<T> over a generic collection.

C# statement foreach is designed to easily iterate through the collection that implements System.Collections.IEnumerator and/or System.Collections.Generic.IEnumerator<T> interface. Since C# v2, foreach is also able to iterate through types that implement System.Collections.Generic.IEnumerable<T> and System.Collections.Generic.IEnumerator<T> 

Example of using foreach statement:

var primes = new List<int>{ 2, 3, 5, 7, 11, 13, 17, 19 };
long m = 1;
foreach (var prime in primes)
    m *= prime;

C++ 
C++ implements iterators with the semantics of pointers in that language. In C++, a class can overload all of the pointer operations, so an iterator can be implemented that acts more or less like a pointer, complete with dereference, increment, and decrement. This has the advantage that C++ algorithms such as std::sort can immediately be applied to plain old memory buffers, and that there is no new syntax to learn. However, it requires an "end" iterator to test for equality, rather than allowing an iterator to know that it has reached the end. In C++ language, we say that an iterator models the iterator concept.

Java 
Java has the  interface.

A simple example showing how to return integers between [start, end] using an Iterator
import java.util.Iterator;
import java.util.NoSuchElementException;

public class RangeIteratorExample {
    public static Iterator<Integer> range(int start, int end) {
        return new Iterator<>() {
            private int index = start;
      
            @Override
            public boolean hasNext() {
                return index < end;
            }

            @Override
            public Integer next() {
                if (!hasNext()) {
                    throw new NoSuchElementException();
                }
                return index++;
            }
        };
    }
    
    public static void main(String[] args) {
        var iterator = range(0, 10);
        while (iterator.hasNext()) {
            System.out.println(iterator.next());
        }
        
        // or using a lambda
        iterator.forEachRemaining(System.out::println);
    }
}

As of Java 5, objects implementing the  interface, which returns an Iterator from its only method, can be traversed using Java's foreach loop syntax. The  interface from the Java collections framework extends Iterable.

Example of class Family implementing the Iterable interface:import java.util.Iterator;
import java.util.Set;

class Family<E> implements Iterable<E> {
    private final Set<E> elements;
  
    public Family(Set<E> elements) {
        this.elements = Set.copyOf(elements);
    }
    
    @Override
    public Iterator<E> iterator() {
        return elements.iterator();
    }
}

The class IterableExample demonstrates the use of class Family :public class IterableExample {
    public static void main(String[] args) {
        var weasleys = Set.of(
            "Arthur", "Molly", "Bill", "Charlie",
            "Percy", "Fred", "George", "Ron", "Ginny"
            );
        var family = new Family<>(weasleys);
    
        for (var name : family) {
            System.out.println(name + " Weasley");
        }
    }
}Output:Ron Weasley
Molly Weasley
Percy Weasley
Fred Weasley
Charlie Weasley
George Weasley
Arthur Weasley
Ginny Weasley
Bill Weasley

JavaScript 

JavaScript, as part of ECMAScript 6, supports the iterator pattern with any object that provides a next() method, which returns an object with two specific properties: done and value. Here's an example that shows a reverse array iterator:

function reverseArrayIterator(array) {
    var index = array.length - 1;
    return {
       next: =>
          index >= 0 ?
           {value: array[index--], done: false} :
           {done: true}
    }
}

const it = reverseArrayIterator(['three', 'two', 'one']);
console.log(it.next().value);  //-> 'one'
console.log(it.next().value);  //-> 'two'
console.log(it.next().value);  //-> 'three'
console.log(`Are you done? ${it.next().done}`);  //-> true

Most of the time, though, it is desirable to provide Iterator semantics on objects so that they can be iterated automatically via for...of loops. Some of JavaScript's built-in types such as Array, Map, or Set already define their own iteration behavior. The same effect can be achieved by defining an object's meta @@iterator method, also referred to by Symbol.iterator. This creates an Iterable object.

Here's an example of a range function that generates a list of values starting from start to end, exclusive, using a regular for loop to generate the numbers:

function range(start, end) {
  return {
    [Symbol.iterator]() { // #A
      return this;
    },
    next() {
      if (start < end) {
        return { value: start++, done: false }; // #B
      }
      return { done: true, value: end }; // #B
    }
  }
}

for (number of range(1, 5)) {
  console.log(number);   // -> 1, 2, 3, 4
}

The iteration mechanism of built-in types, like strings, can also be manipulated:

let iter = ['I', 't', 'e', 'r', 'a', 't', 'o', 'r'][Symbol.iterator]();
iter.next().value; //-> I
iter.next().value; //-> t

PHP 

PHP supports the iterator pattern via the Iterator interface, as part of the standard distribution. Objects that implement the interface can be iterated over with the foreach language construct.

Example of patterns using PHP:

<?php

// BookIterator.php

namespace DesignPatterns;

class BookIterator implements \Iterator
{
    private int $i_position = 0;
    private BookCollection $booksCollection;

    public function __construct(BookCollection $booksCollection)
    {
        $this->booksCollection = $booksCollection;
    }

    public function current()
    {
        return $this->booksCollection->getTitle($this->i_position);
    }

    public function key(): int
    {
        return $this->i_position;
    }

    public function next(): void
    {
        $this->i_position++;
    }

    public function rewind(): void
    {
        $this->i_position = 0;
    }

    public function valid(): bool
    {
        return !is_null($this->booksCollection->getTitle($this->i_position));
    }
}
<?php

// BookCollection.php

namespace DesignPatterns;

class BookCollection implements \IteratorAggregate
{
    private array $a_titles = array();

    public function getIterator()
    {
        return new BookIterator($this);
    }

    public function addTitle(string $string): void
    {
        $this->a_titles[] = $string;
    }

    public function getTitle($key)
    {
        if (isset($this->a_titles[$key])) {
            return $this->a_titles[$key];
        }
        return null;
    }

    public function is_empty(): bool
    {
        return empty($this->$a_titles);
    }
}
<?php

// index.php

require 'vendor/autoload.php';
use DesignPatterns\BookCollection;

$booksCollection = new BookCollection();
$booksCollection->addTitle('Design Patterns');
$booksCollection->addTitle('PHP7 is the best');
$booksCollection->addTitle('Laravel Rules');
$booksCollection->addTitle('DHH Rules');

foreach ($booksCollection as $book) {
    var_dump($book);
}

Output 
 string(15) "Design Patterns"
 string(16) "PHP7 is the best"
 string(13) "Laravel Rules"
 string(9) "DHH Rules"

Python 
Python prescribes a syntax for iterators as part of the language itself, so that language keywords such as for work with what Python calls iterables. An iterable has an __iter__() method that returns an iterator object. The "iterator protocol" requires next() return the next element or raise a StopIteration exception upon reaching the end of the sequence. Iterators also provide an __iter__() method returning themselves so that they can also be iterated over; e.g., using a for loop. Generators are available since 2.2.

In Python 3, next() was renamed __next__().

Raku 
Raku provides APIs for iterators, as part of the language itself, for objects that can be iterated with for and related iteration constructs, like assignment to a Positional variable. An iterable must at least implement an iterator method that returns an iterator object. The "iterator protocol" requires the pull-one method to return the next element if possible, or return the sentinel value IterationEnd if no more values could be produced. The iteration APIs is provided by composing the Iterable role, Iterator, or both, and implementing the required methods. 

To check if a type object or an object instance is iterable, the does method can be used:

say Array.does(Iterable);     #=> True
say [1, 2, 3].does(Iterable); #=> True
say Str.does(Iterable);       #=> False
say "Hello".does(Iterable);   #=> False

The does method returns True if and only if the invocant conforms to the argument type.

Here's an example of a range subroutine that mimics Python's range function:

multi range(Int:D $start, Int:D $end where * <= $start, Int:D $step where * < 0 = -1) {
    (class {
        also does Iterable does Iterator;
        has Int ($.start, $.end, $.step);
        has Int $!count = $!start;

        method iterator { self }
        method pull-one(--> Mu) {
            if $!count > $!end {
                my $i = $!count;
                $!count += $!step;
                return $i;
            }
            else {
                $!count = $!start;
                return IterationEnd;
            }
        }
    }).new(:$start, :$end, :$step)
}

multi range(Int:D $start, Int:D $end where * >= $start, Int:D $step where * > 0 = 1) {
    (class {
        also does Iterable does Iterator;
        has Int ($.start, $.end, $.step);
        has Int $!count = $!start;

        method iterator { self }
        method pull-one(--> Mu) {
            if $!count < $!end {
                my $i = $!count;
                $!count += $!step;
                return $i;
            }
            else {
                $!count = $!start;
                return IterationEnd;
            }
        }
    }).new(:$start, :$end, :$step)
}

my \x = range(1, 5);
.say for x;
# OUTPUT:
# 1
# 2
# 3
# 4

say x.map(* ** 2).sum;
# OUTPUT:
# 30

my \y = range(-1, -5);
.say for y;
# OUTPUT:
# -1
# -2
# -3
# -4

say y.map(* ** 2).sum;
# OUTPUT:
# 30

See also 
 Composite pattern
 Container (data structure)
 Design pattern (computer science)
 Iterator
 Observer pattern

References

External links 

 Object iteration in PHP
 Iterator Pattern in C#
 Iterator pattern in UML and in LePUS3 (a formal modelling language)
 SourceMaking tutorial
 Design Patterns implementation examples tutorial
 Iterator Pattern

Articles with example C++ code
Articles with example C Sharp code
Articles with example JavaScript code
Articles with example Perl code
Articles with example PHP code
Iteration in programming
Software design patterns